The Bjoreio, also known as the Bjoreia, is a river in the municipality of Eidfjord in Vestland, Norway.

The Bjoreio has its origin on the northwest side of Sildabunutane, a  mountain in Hardangervidda National Park. When it flows out of Tinnhølen the river is now named Bjoreio, and it runs to the northwest out of the national park and down through the Bjorei Valley (Bjoreidalen). At the Nybu tourist lodge it is joined by the Svinto from the east. Here the river runs through the Bjorei Valley Nature Reserve (Bjoreidalen naturreservat). In the nature reserve there is a ban on walking outside specially marked trails from May 20 to July 20 to protect nesting birds. The rivers continues westward through the Sysen Valley, where its tributaries include the Isdølo from the north and the Drolstølbekken from the south. The river empties into Lake Eidfjord in Øvre Eidfjord, only  from the nearby Veig River. At the opposite end of Lake Eidfjord, the short Eio River empties into the Hardanger Fjord.

Together with the nearby Sima River to the north, the Bjoreio River has been developed for power production at the Sima Hydroelectric Power Station. Lake Sysen is used as the main reservoir. The river's flow has been diverted through a tunnel to the lake and, together with the upper course of the Isdølo, the water is then directed to the power station below Kjeåsen on the north side of the Simadal Fjord. The river bed below the Sysen Dam is dry for most of the year, but during the summer season it is required to release water so that the flow at Vøring Falls is at least .

At the lower end of Lake Måbø (Måbøvatnet), the old road through the valley crosses the river over the Måbø Bridge.

See also
List of rivers in Norway

References

Rivers of Vestland
Eidfjord
Rivers of Norway